Cheirocerus eques, is a species of demersal catfish of the family Pimelodidae that is native to Amazon River basin of Brazil.

It grows to a length of 18.0 cm. It inhabits fresh water rivers in rio Canoas and its tributaries in Santa Catarina, Brazil.

It is clearly distinguished from other species with 17-21 gill rakers. It feeds primarily on benthic invertebrates.

References

Pimelodidae
Catfish of South America
Freshwater fish of Brazil
Fish described in 1917